St Germans was a rotten borough in Cornwall which returned two Members of Parliament to the House of Commons in the English and later British Parliament from 1562 to 1832, when it was abolished by the Great Reform Act.

History
The borough consisted of part of St Germans parish in South-East Cornwall, a coastal town too small to have a mayor and corporation, where the chief economic activity was fishing. Like most of the Cornish boroughs enfranchised or re-enfranchised during the Tudor period, it was a rotten borough from the start.

The right to vote rested in theory with all (adult male) householders, but in practice only a handful (who called themselves freemen) exercised the right; there were only seven voters in 1831. The Eliot family had exercised complete control over the choice of MPs for many years, as was also true at nearby Liskeard.

In 1831, the borough had a population of 672, and 99 houses. The boundaries excluded part of the town, which consisted of 124 houses in total, but this was still far too small to justify its retaining its representation, and St Germans was disfranchised by the Reform Act in 1832. The decision, however, was controversial: the whole parish (of which the town made up only a fraction) had a population in the 1821 census of 2,404, and the initial proposal was that St Germans should lose only one of its two MPs.  But the borough covered only , and the town 50, in a parish of more than 9,000 acres (36 km2). The Whig government decided that the availability in a surrounding parish of sufficient population should not save a borough from disfranchisement, unless a substantial part of that population was already within the borough boundaries. The bill's schedules were amended so as to extinguish both of the St Germans MPs, saving instead the second MP at Penryn (where the boundaries had been extended to take in the neighbouring town of Falmouth). The Tory opposition attacked the decision as politically motivated (St Germans was a Tory borough), and the vote in the Commons was one of the narrowest in the entire reform bill debates.

Members of Parliament

MPs 1563–1629

MPs 1640–1832

Notes

References

Michael Brock, The Great Reform Act (London: Hutchinson, 1973)
D. Brunton & D. H. Pennington, Members of the Long Parliament (London: George Allen & Unwin, 1954)
Cobbett's Parliamentary history of England, from the Norman Conquest in 1066 to the year 1803 (London: Thomas Hansard, 1808) 
J E Neale, The Elizabethan House of Commons (London: Jonathan Cape, 1949)
J Holladay Philbin, Parliamentary Representation 1832 – England and Wales (New Haven: Yale University Press, 1965)
Henry Stooks Smith, The Parliaments of England from 1715 to 1847 (2nd edition, edited by FWS Craig – Chichester: Parliamentary Reference Publications, 1973)
 

Parliamentary constituencies in Cornwall (historic)
Constituencies of the Parliament of the United Kingdom established in 1562
Constituencies of the Parliament of the United Kingdom disestablished in 1832
Rotten boroughs